Princess Ebba Bernadotte (née Ebba Henrietta Munck af Fulkila; 24 October 1858 – 16 October 1946), was a Swedish noble, lady-in-waiting and a titular princess, the spouse of Prince Oscar Bernadotte.

Life

She was the daughter of Finnish-born noble Colonel Carl Jacob  and Baroness Henrica Cederström. She was a lady-in-waiting of the Crown Princess, Victoria of Baden, who in 1885 visited her brother-in-law in Amsterdam, where he was to undergo a medical examination for a heart difficulty.

Marriage

Ebba and Oscar visited the Norwegian sailor church during their stay in Amsterdam and fell in love: Ebba was religious and influenced Oscar in this regard. When Oscar told his family that he wished to marry Ebba, they were scandalized and he was forced to take a two-year consideration period, and Ebba was dismissed as a lady-in-waiting. In 1887, Oscar told his family that he had not changed his mind, and the Royal House gave its consent to the marriage on condition that Oscar's brothers signed a document promising that they should never enter a similar marriage, which they did.

On January 21, 1888, a ball was arranged at the Royal Palace of Stockholm, where Ebba and Oscar were allowed to dance with each other, and on 29 January 1888, the engagement was formally announced. The match was regarded as a great sorrow within the royal house, but it received a lot of sympathy from the public. It was said that a bridge had been placed between the people and the Royal House: "The Munck bridge", and the fact that Oscar had to give up his royal title made people say that the King no longer had four sons but only three, as one of them "married and had to quit". When the couple left Stockholm, a large crowd had gathered on the train station to see them off and show their support.

Ebba and Oscar were married 15 March 1888 in Saint Stephens Church in Bournemouth in England by the vicar Gustaf Beskow, who was close to the Queen, Sofia of Nassau, in the presence of Oscar's mother, Queen Sophia, two of his brothers, Prince Carl, Duke of Västergötland and Prince Eugen, Duke of Närke, and his cousin, the Danish Crown princess, Louise of Sweden, as well as Ebba's mother and brother. In Sweden she was given the unclarified title of "Princess Bernadotte" instead of the royal "Princess of Sweden".

Later life
After her marriage, Ebba Bernadotte devoted her life to Christian charity. The couple lived a simple life in Stockholm away from the royal court and was regarded with great sympathy due to the circumstances of their marriage. Their relationship was described as happy, and they devoted themselves to their common interests in religion and Christian influenced social work. 

Ebba Bernadotte was a member of a number of different Christian charitable organisations: in 1894, she became a member of the Lapska missionens vänner ('Friends of the Sami Mission'), in 1897-1912 she was a board member of the Kristliga föreningens av unga kvinnor ('Christian Society For Young Women') and in 1900, she became chairperson of Bokpåsemissionen för sjömän (' Bookbag-Mission For Sailors'), which had its meetings in her home.

References

Further reading
 

1858 births
1946 deaths
Swedish nobility
Swedish ladies-in-waiting
Swedish princesses
Swedish maids of honour
Ebba
Morganatic spouses
Swedish philanthropists
19th-century philanthropists
20th-century philanthropists
Swedish people of Finnish descent